Mount Dongjunda is a mountain in Xinyi Township, Nantou County, Taiwan with an elevation of .

See also
List of mountains in Taiwan

References

Landforms of Nantou County
Dongjun